Atractus spinalis is a species of snake in the family Colubridae. The species can be found in Brazil.

References 

Atractus
Endemic fauna of Brazil
Reptiles of Brazil]
Snakes of South America
Reptiles described in 2013